Bolma guttata, common name the sandpaper bolma,  is a species of sea snail, a marine gastropod mollusk in the family Turbinidae, the turban snails.

Description
The size of the shell varies between 35 mm and 45 mm. The turbinate-conic shell has an umbilicus covered by callus. The spire is elevated. Its color pattern is flesh-colored, gold-tinted, and punctate with reddish. The deep sutures are canaliculate. The convex whorls are  cingulate with rows of bead-like separated granules. The interstices are longitudinally obliquely striate. At the suture they are ornamented with a series of squamiform tubercles. The circular aperture is sulcate within, a thin wide callus covering the umbilicus.

Distribution
This marine species occurs off Japan, the Philippines and Queensland, Australia.

References

External links
 To Encyclopedia of Life
 To GenBank (1 nucleotides; 0 proteins)
 To World Register of Marine Species
 

guttata
Gastropods described in 1863